The Garden Route District Municipality ( or Garden Route Distriksmunisipaliteit; ; formerly known as the Eden District Municipality) is a district municipality located in the Western Cape Province of South Africa. Its municipality code is DC4.

Geography
It stretches to the Breede River mouth and the Langeberg mountains on the west, where it abuts the Overberg District Municipality and (for a short distance) the Cape Winelands District Municipality. To the north the boundary with the Central Karoo District Municipality runs along the Swartberg mountains. In the east the municipality runs up to the Eastern Cape provincial boundary.

The district is divided into seven local municipalities, described in the following table.

Demographics
The following statistics are from the 2011 Census. Note that due to fuzzing applied to statistics, columns may not sum to exactly the indicated total.

Politics

The council of the Garden Route District Municipality consists of thirty-five councillors. Fourteen councillors are directly elected by party-list proportional representation, and twenty-one are appointed by the councils of the local municipalities in the district: six by George, four by Mossel Bay, three each by Oudtshoorn and Knysna, two each by Hessequa and Bitou, and one by Kannaland.

After the election of 3 August 2016 there are twenty-one councillors from the Democratic Alliance (DA), twelve from the African National Congress (ANC), and one each from the Independent Civic Organisation of South Africa (ICOSA) and the African Independent Congress (AIC).

The following table shows the detailed composition of the council.

The following table shows the results of the election of the fourteen directly elected councillors.

References

External links
 Garden Route District Municipality official website

District municipalities of the Western Cape
Garden Route District Municipality